Weeping Nights is the third album by neoclassical band Elend. Although released before The Umbersun, it is not a part of the Officium Tenebrarum trilogy. The album contains three original songs (the first track being of their own and the following two being adaptations of pieces by Henry Purcell), and six remixes of songs from their previous album, Les Ténèbres du Dehors.  The remixed tracks are virtually exactly the same as on Les Ténèbres du Dehors, only all male vocals have been removed.  The only two tracks from the previous album which do not appear here are "The Silence of Light" (track 5) and "Antienne" (track 6), presumably because they had no male vocals to begin with and because of limited space on the CD.

Track listing

Musicians
All instruments and vocals performed by Nathalie Barbary, Iskandar Hasnawi and Renaud Tschirner.

References 

1997 albums
Elend (band) albums